The Hong Kong Council of Social Service (HKCSS;  or 社聯) is a council coordinating NGOs in the social service field in Hong Kong, established in 1947. The Hong Kong Council of Social Service represent more than 480 Agency Members that provide social services through their 3,000 operating units in Hong Kong.

History
In 1951 became a statutory body. There are more than 370 institutional members, more than 3,000 service units providing social welfare service to over 90% of the Hong Kong population.

 HKCSS was established in 1947 to co-ordinate refugee relief work.

Scope of work 
HKCSS has two major types of services: "Member service and Professional Aid" and ""Social Service". Member service and Professional Aid is divided into five different sectors of work: Sector Development & Partnership, Service Development, Quality Management & Efficiency Enhancement, Policy Research & Advocacy and International & Regional Networking. And Social Service is divided into four categories: Children & Youth, Elderly, Family and Communities and Rehabilitation.

Social service

Children & youth

Elderly

Family and communities
Development of services, including family, community development, new arrivals, ethnic minorities and substance abuse
It now has 134 registered member agencies.

Rehabilitation
Promote the coordination and improvement of services and facilities for persons with disabilities
Participate in policy review and formulation
Conduct public education
Develop new rehabilitation programs

Core business
It is a part describing the core businesses of HKCSS in details. Some of them are already mentioned in 'Scope of Work'. There are totally six different types of core businesses, including Sector development and partnership, Service Development, Policy research and advocacy, International and regional networking, Information Technology Service Centre and HKCSS-HSBC Social Enterprise Business Centre.

1. Sector development and partnership

2. Service development

A. Children and youth service
It is responsible for development of Children & Youth service.

B. Elderly service

C. Family and community service
It is responsible for the development of services, including family, community development, new arrivals, ethnic minorities and substance abuse. It now has 165 registered member agencies. A paper on the existing family and community situation and services is available for download.

D. Rehabilitation service
The Hong Kong Joint Council for People with Disabilities is the umbrella body of non-governmental organisations for and of persons with disabilities in Hong Kong. It was granted exemption of registration under the Societies Ordinance (cap. 151) in October 1965. The aims of the Joint Council are to promote the coordination and improvement of services and facilities for persons with disabilities, participate in policy review and formulation, conduct public education and develop new rehabilitation programmes. It also plays an important role in the local and international rehabilitation field. As the objectives of the Joint Council are similar to the Hong Kong Council of Social Service (HKCSS), the Joint Council was incorporated into the HKCSS and became the Rehabilitation Division of HKCSS in November 1965. Further to the 2001 organizational review and re-structuring of HKCSS, it has been agreed that such partnership relationship shall be maintained and, from December the same year onward the Management Committee of Joint Council would be equivalent to the Rehabilitation Specialized Committee of HKCSS.

3. Policy research and advocacy
It is an aspect to collect data on social development, so as to understand and predict the trend of social development, conduct scientific research on policies which have an influential impact on welfare and social development, advocate for justice and rational public and social policies, maintain regular dialogue with policy makers, monitor the implementation of policies proposed by HKCSS. The events include Civil Service Summit on Urban Renewal, Seminar on Job Creation at District Level, Civic Sidewalk Issue and the Young Policy Analyst Program (YPAP).

4. International and regional networking
Major Work of International and Regional Networking 
International and Regional Networking is one of the core businesses of the Hong Kong Council of Social Service.

5. Information technology service centre
The aims of the centre include the enhancement of the ICT capacity of NGOs, the exploration, experiments and promotion of ways to deploy ICT in sector and the promotion of digital inclusion and equitable ICT policies in information society. There are six different services provided, which are Products and Services, Workplace IT Skill Training, Web Services, Secondment, System Development and Consultation Services.

Partnership
The council has initiated cross-sectoral collaboration projects to bring together wisdom, resources and efforts from the business sector, professional groups, policy makers and the Government in areas of service enhancement, NGOs capacity building and benefiting disadvantaged groups.

Caring Company Scheme  is one of the major partnership program.
Others included co-operation with RTHK, HSBC, tertiary institutions, etc.

Committees 
(updated to 2010)
Chief executive is Ms. Christine M. S. Fang.
Business Director for Sector Development & Partnership is Mr. Cliff K. W. Choi.
Business Director for Service Development is Dr. Timothy W. L. Chan.
Business Director for Policy Advocacy & International Networks is Mr. Chua Hoi Wai.
Business Director for Corporate Management is Mr. Joseph K. M. Wong.

See also
 Non-profit organisations based in Hong Kong

References

External links
 Official site
HSBC website : HKCSS-HSBC Social Enterprise Business Centre
 District Cyber Centres Pilot Scheme
 Caring Company

Non-profit organisations based in Hong Kong
Social care in Hong Kong
1947 establishments in Hong Kong
Statutory bodies in Hong Kong